is a Japanese jidaigeki or period drama that was broadcast in prime-time in 1974. It is based on Renzaburō Shibata's novel of the same title. The lead star is Masakazu Tamura.

Plot
Akizuki Rokurōta was born as a child of Tokugawa Ieyasu, but since he is a twin with Tokugawa Iemitsu, he is not allowed to appear in the center of the stage. Thus He continues his wandering trip. One day he accidentally meets Toyotomi Hideyori's son Toyotomi Hideya and her mother. Tokugawa Shogunate and Yagyū clan try to kill them. On the other hand villains try to use them. Akizuki Rokurōta decides to protect them from Tokugawa Shogunate and villains.

Cast

Masakazu Tamura as Akizuki Rokurōta/Tokugawa Iemitsu
Goro Ibuki as Yagyū Jūbei Mitsuyoshi
Jūshirō Konoe as Yagyū Munenori
Yoshio Yoshida as Tenkai
Ichirō Arishima as Takuan Sōhō
Naoko Otani as Renko
 Rokko Toura as Yami no Hichibei
Yayoi Watanabe as Sasaka
Kei Satō as Asahina Genzaemon
Atsushi Watanabe as Iga Ninja Unten

Other adaptations
Kōsei Saitō directed 3 hours special drama version which aired January 6, 1993 on Fuji TV. The lead role was played by Ken Matsudaira. theme music by Masahiko Satoh, Screen play by Motomu Furuta.
Ken Matsudaira as Akizuki Rokurōta
Tomokazu Miura as Miyamoto Musashi
Shigeru Tsuyuguchi as Yagyū Munenori
Hiroshi Abe as Yagyū Jūbei Mitsuyoshi
Morio Kazama as Tokugawa Iemitsu
Narumi Arimori
Chiaki Matsubara
Hideji Ōtaki
Yoichi Hayashi as Hattori Hanzō
Shōhei Hino as Iga Ninja Unten

References

1974 Japanese television series debuts
1970s drama television series
Jidaigeki television series
Jidaigeki
Cultural depictions of Tokugawa Iemitsu
Cultural depictions of Yagyū clan
Television series set in the 17th century
Television shows based on Japanese novels